Borrichia arborescens is a species of flowering plant in the family Asteraceae known by the common name tree seaside tansy. It is native to the Yucatán Peninsula, Cuba, Jamaica, Bahamas, Cayman Islands, Hispaniola, Puerto Rico, Bermuda, the Florida Keys, and other islands in the region. It is found on rocky and sandy coasts, in both beaches and marshes.

Borrichia arborescens produces yellow flower heads in late spring and summer. Despite its common name, it is only a shrub reaching heights of 5 feet (150 cm).

Hybrids with Borrichia frutescens are known where the two species come into contact.

References

Flora of the Caribbean
Plants described in 1759
Flora of the Yucatán Peninsula
Flora without expected TNC conservation status